Conall mac Máele Dúib, died 629)  14th King of the Uí Maine. 

In his time the Uí Maine were allied and subject to the Ui Fiachrach Aidhne, a branch of the Connachta. They were ruled at this time by Guaire Aidne mac Colmáin (died 663) who ruled at the height of their power. Guaire attacked Munster but was defeated at the Battle of Carn Feradaig (Carhernarry, County Limerick) by the Munster king Faílbe Flann mac Áedo Duib (died 639). Conall was slain fighting on Guaire's side in this battle.

Notes

References

 Annals of Ulster at CELT: Corpus of Electronic Texts at University College Cork
 Annals of Tigernach at CELT: Corpus of Electronic Texts at University College Cork
Revised edition of McCarthy's synchronisms at Trinity College Dublin.
 Byrne, Francis John (2001), Irish Kings and High-Kings, Dublin: Four Courts Press, 

People from County Galway
People from County Roscommon
629 deaths
7th-century Irish monarchs
Year of birth unknown
Kings of Uí Maine